The Society of Saint Edmund also known as the Edmundites, is a clerical religious congregation of Pontifical Right for men in the Catholic Church founded in 1843, in Pontigny, France, by Jean Baptiste Muard. The congregation is  named after Saint Edmund. The members of the congregation add the postnominal letters S.S.E.

History
Members of the Society, based in Pontigny, fled to the United States through Montreal, Canada in 1889 after widespread anticlericalism seized France. The Society of St. Edmund settled in Winooski, Vermont, and established Saint Michael's College in 1904. The original motherhouse is at Pontigny, but since the expulsion of the religious institutes the superior general resided at Hitchin, England.

In the early 20th century, the congregation had two houses in the United States: a missionary house and apostolic school at Swanton, Vermont, for the training of young men who wish to study for the priesthood and the religious life; and a college at Colchester, Vermont, with 12 fathers, 8 scholastics, and 100 pupils.  Saint Michael's College has since expanded to 2,000 undergraduates and 650 graduate students.

In 1937 the Society turned to the missions of African Americans, mainly in Alabama, thanks to Father Francis "Frank" Casey. During the Civil rights movement and the lead up to the Selma to Montgomery marches, the Society was the only white group in Selma who openly supported the voting rights campaign. Student Nonviolent Coordinating Committee staff member Don Jelinek later described this order as "the unsung heroes of the Selma March... who provided the only integrated Catholic church in Selma, and perhaps in the entire Deep South".

Present-day
The Society was formed to keep St. Edmund's memory and life alive through faithful service, for the work of popular missions. The members also devote themselves to parochial work, to the education of youth in seminaries and colleges, to the direction of pious associations, and to foreign missions.

References

External links
 Society of Saint Edmund  Order website
 Saint Michael's College, established by the Society in 1904

Catholic orders and societies
Religious organizations established in 1843
African-American Roman Catholicism
Catholic religious institutes established in the 19th century
1843 establishments in France
1889 establishments in Vermont